Arki may refer to:
Arki, India, a town in Himachal Pradesh, India
Arki Fort
Arki (Vidhan Sabha constituency)
Arki block, a community development block in Jharkhand, India
Arki, Khunti, a village in Jharkhand, India
Arki, Iran, a village in Razavi Khorasan Province, Iran
Nichijou, a manga and anime series (manga was released in Finland as Arki)

See also
Arkie
Arkies
Arkley
Arkoi